The following lists events that happened during 1998 in South Africa.

Incumbents
 President: Nelson Mandela.
 Deputy President: Thabo Mbeki.
 Chief Justice: vacant then Ismail Mahomed.

Cabinet 
The Cabinet, together with the President and the Deputy President, forms part of the Executive.

National Assembly

Provincial Premiers 
 Eastern Cape Province: Makhenkesi Stofile 
 Free State Province: Ivy Matsepe-Casaburri
 Gauteng Province: Tokyo Sexwale (until 19 January), Mathole Motshekga (since 19 January)
 KwaZulu-Natal Province: Ben Ngubane 
 Limpopo Province: Ngoako Ramathlodi
 Mpumalanga Province: Mathews Phosa
 North West Province: Popo Molefe 
 Northern Cape Province: Manne Dipico
 Western Cape Province: Hernus Kriel (until 11 May), Gerald Morkel (since 11 May)

Events
January
 3 – Six policemen from the North East Rand Dog Unit set their dogs on three suspected illegal immigrants, allowing the animals to savage the three men while the officers hurl racial insults.

March
 9 – Robert McBride, official in the Department of Foreign Affairs, is arrested for gun smuggling by the Mozambican police.
 18 – A recently restored South African Air Force Museum ex-Rhodesian Air Force Percival Provost Mk 52 crashes. Denel Aviation test pilot Rick Culpan dies from his injuries four days later.
 21 – The Socialist Party of Azania (SOPA) is founded.

May
 19 – Voortrekkerhoogte is renamed Thaba Tshwane.

June
 4 – Ferdi Barnard, Civil Cooperation Bureau member, receives 2 life sentences plus 63 years in prison for the murder of David Webster.

July
 7 – Theuns Swanepoel, the "Rooi Rus" policeman who gave the order to open fire on Soweto uprising rioters, dies without confessing.
 Highly acclaimed South African Soap opera Isidingo debuts on SABC 3.
 16 – Bulelani Ngcuka is elected as the first National Director of Public Prosecutions.

August
 21 – President Nelson Mandela calls for a summit over the Congo conflict, inviting the leaders of the Democratic Republic of the Congo, Rwanda, Uganda and Zimbabwe to attend.
 25 – A pipe bomb explodes at Cape Town's Victoria & Alfred Waterfront's Planet Hollywood restaurant, seriously injuring 26 people of which two later die in hospital.

September
 3 – South Africa supports the intervention in the Democratic Republic of the Congo by Namibia, Zimbabwe and Angola in support of Kabila.
 14 – Robert McBride is conditionally released from prison in Mozambique.
 16 – A South African Air Force Impala Mk I crashes at AFB Bloemspruit.

October
 1 – e.tv is launched.
 9 – The Constitutional Court invalidates the sodomy laws in the case of National Coalition for Gay and Lesbian Equality and Another v Minister of Justice and Others.
 29 – Nelson Mandela receives the Truth and Reconciliation report.

December
 10 – South Africa opposes the Congo talks set in Zambia the following week.
 Rock band Watershed is discovered by Sivan Pillay in Times Square, Sandton.

Unknown date
 The Black Tie Ensemble is founded by Mimi Coertse and Neels Hansen.

Births
 19 July – Lasizwe Dambuza, media personality
 2 September – Ama Qamata, actress
 Birth of Austin Rethabile Mothapo, a talented actor

Deaths
 22 February – Athol Rowan, cricketer. (b. 1921)
 22 April – Kitch Christie, Springbok rugby coach. (b. 1940)
 7 May – Allan McLeod Cormack, physicist and Nobel laureate. (b. 1924)
 8 June – Jackie McGlew, cricketer. (b. 1929)

Sports

Boxing
 5 June – Thulani Malinga, super middleweight boxer, wins the World Boxing Federation (WBF) title.

Soccer
Bafana Bafana participate in their first ever FIFA World Cup hosted in France, eventually being eliminated in the group stages.

References

South Africa
Years in South Africa
History of South Africa